No. 334 (Norwegian) Squadron was a Royal Air Force aircraft squadron that operated after the Second World War. Established after V-E Day, it soon became 334 Squadron of the Royal Norwegian Air Force.

History
The squadron was formed on 26 May 1945 at RAF Banff, Scotland from B Flight of 333 Squadron. The squadron operated the de Havilland Mosquito on anti-shipping sorties and other operations along the Norwegian coast. Within a few weeks it had moved to Gardermoen and control was handed over to the Royal Norwegian Air Force on 21 November 1945.

Aircraft operated

See also
List of Royal Air Force aircraft squadrons

Notes

References

 

Military units and formations established in 1945
Royal Air Force aircraft squadrons
Royal Norwegian Air Force squadrons